Santiago González and Édouard Roger-Vasselin defeated Nicolas Mahut and Fabrice Martin in the final, 4–6, 7–6(7–4), [10–7] to win the doubles tennis title at the 2023 Open 13.

Denys Molchanov and Andrey Rublev were the reigning champions, but Rublev chose to compete in Doha instead. Molchanov partnered Jonathan Eysseric, but lost in the quarterfinals to Mahut and Martin.

Seeds

Draw

Draw

References

External links
 Main draw

Open 13 Provence - Doubles
2023 Doubles
2023 in French sport